Mesem (Mesẽ) is a Papuan language spoken in Morobe Province, Papua New Guinea.

Writing system

References

Languages of Morobe Province
Huon languages